DXVP (1476 AM) El Radio Verdadero is a radio station owned and operated by the Roman Catholic Archdiocese of Zamboanga. The station's studio is located at Sacred Heart Center, RT Lim Blvd., Zamboanga City.

References

Catholic radio stations
Radio stations established in 1985
Radio stations in Zamboanga City